The Cape Region whiptail (Aspidoscelis maximus) is a species of teiid lizard endemic to the Baja California Peninsula of Mexico.

References

maximus
Reptiles described in 1863
Taxa named by Edward Drinker Cope
Reptiles of Mexico